YTN Group is a multimedia group of YTN, producing media, broadcast and telecommunication products.

Subsidiaries
YTN
YTN WORLD, YTN KOREAN(YTN's Satellite broadcasting service for outside South Korea)
YTN science (September 2007~)
YTN Life (July 2011~)
YTN DMB
YTN Radio
YTN PLUS
N Seoul Tower

Former
CU Media (former YTN Media) (sold to iHQ Inc. in 2005)
AXN Korea 
Comedy TV(Producing and Re-broadcasting Korean comedy programmes)
Y Star (Previously YTN Star)(Entertainment channel)

See also
Economy of South Korea
List of South Korean companies
Communications in South Korea

Yonhap is no longer included in YTN Group

External group links
YTN
YonhapNews
YonhapNewsTV newsy
YTN DMB
YTN PLUS
N Seoul Tower
YTN WORLD, YTN KOREAN

 
Telecommunications companies of South Korea